Kent County is located in the U.S. state of Michigan. As of the 2020 Census, the county had a population of 657,974, making it the fourth most populous county in Michigan, and the largest outside of the Detroit area. Its county seat is Grand Rapids. The county was set off in 1831, and organized in 1836. It is named for New York jurist and legal scholar James Kent, who represented the Michigan Territory in its dispute with Ohio over the Toledo Strip.

Kent County is part of the Grand Rapids–Kentwood Metropolitan Statistical Area and is West Michigan's economic and manufacturing center. It is home of the Frederik Meijer Gardens, a significant cultural landmark of the Midwest. The Gerald R. Ford International Airport is the county's primary location for regional and international airline traffic.

History
The Grand River runs through the county. On its west bank are burial mounds, remnants of the Hopewell Indians who lived there. The river valley was an important center for the fur trade in the early 19th century. After the War of 1812, Rix Robinson and Louis Campau were the earliest traders in the area. In 1826, Campau established a trading post in what is today Grand Rapids. In 1831, he bought land and platted the town. Campau is considered the town's "father". One year later, government surveyor Lucius Lyon purchased land north of Campau's property. Campau surveyed and platted the village following Native American trails and Lyon had platted his property in an English grid format, which meant there were two adjoining villages, with different platting formats. Campau later merged the villages under the name of Grand Rapids.

In 1831, it was set off from Kalamazoo County. In 1838, Grand Rapids was incorporated as the county's first village. By the end of the century, stimulated by the construction of several sawmills, the area was a significant center for agriculture, logging, and manufacturing furniture.

Geography

Kent County's highest point is Fisk Knob Park, in Solon Township, at 1048 feet.

Rivers
Grand River, flows through the county from its eastern border to the west, and after passing through Ottawa County, empties into Lake Michigan at Grand Haven. It has three tributaries in Kent County, listed in order of convergence:
Flat River, enters the county from the east, and joins the Grand from the north, in Lowell.
Thornapple River, enters the county from the south, and joins the Grand in Ada.
Rogue River, enters the county from the north, and joins the Grand in Belmont.

Trails
These hiking and biking trails run through the county:
North Country Trail, runs north–south the length of the county, passing through Cedar Springs, Grattan and Lowell. Lowell is the trail's half-way point, and the national headquarters of the North Country Trail Association is located here.
Thornapple Trail, begins in Kentwood and runs southeast through Dutton and Caledonia.
White Pine Trail begins in Comstock Park and runs northeast through Belmont, Rockford, Cedar Springs, and Sand Lake.
Kent Trails (which is singular in spite of the 's') runs north–south from John Ball Park in Grand Rapids to 84th Street in Byron Township, with an extension that runs east/west along 76th Street and north–south from 76th Street to Douglas Walker Park on 84th street.
The Frederik Meijer Trail, which, as of November, 2008, was incomplete, runs east/west mostly along the M-6 freeway and will connect the Kent Trails and the Thornapple Trail when completed.
Cannon Township Trail runs through Cannon Township in the eastern part of the county from Cannon Township Center on M-44. It runs along M-44 then south near Sunfish Lake Road, turning east through the Cannonsburg Cemetery, and ends at Warren Townsend Park near Cannonsburg.

Adjacent counties

Newaygo County - north
Montcalm County - northeast
Muskegon County - northwest
Ionia County - east
Ottawa County - west
Allegan County, - southwest
Barry County - southeast

Demographics

As of the 2010 United States Census, there were 602,622 people living in the county. 76.1% were non-Hispanic White, 10.2% Black or African American, 2.4% Asian, 0.7% Native American, 4.5% of some other race and 2.6% of two or more races. 9.7% were Hispanic or Latino (of any race).

As of the census of 2000, there were 574,335 people, 212,890 households, and 144,126 families living in the county. The current estimated population is 604,323. The racial makeup of the county was 83.13% White, 8.93% Black or African American, 0.52% Native American, 1.86% Asian, 0.06% Pacific Islander, 3.34% from other races, and 2.16% from two or more races.  7.00% of the population were Hispanic or Latino of any race.

19.6% reported being of Dutch ancestry; 14.9% German, 13.1% English, 7.4% Irish, 7.1% Polish and 5.5% American ancestry according to the 2010 American Community Survey. 90.0% spoke only English at home, while 6.0% spoke Spanish.

There were 212,890 households, out of which 35.80% had children under the age of 18 living with them, 52.30% were married couples living together, 11.60% had a female householder with no husband present, and 32.30% were non-families. 25.60% of all households were made up of individuals, and 8.00% had someone living alone who was 65 years of age or older.  The average household size was 2.64 and the average family size was 3.20.

The age distribution of the county was as follows: 28.30% were under the age of 18, 10.50% from 18 to 24, 31.20% from 25 to 44, 19.70% from 45 to 64, and 10.40% who were 65 years of age or older.  The median age was 32 years. For every 100 females, there were 96.90 males. For every 100 females age 18 and over, there were 93.70 males.

The median income for a household in the county was $45,980, and the median income for a family was $54,770. Males had a median income of $39,878 versus $27,364 for females. The per capita income for the county was $21,629. 8.90% of the population and 6.30% of families were below the poverty line. 10.20% of the population under the age of 18 and 7.50% of those 65 or older were living in poverty.

Transportation

Air service
Commercial air service to Grand Rapids is provided by Gerald R. Ford International Airport (GRR).  Previously named Kent County International Airport, it holds Grand Rapids' mark in modern history with the United States' first regularly scheduled airline service, beginning July 31, 1926, between Grand Rapids and Detroit.

Bus service
Public bus transportation is provided by the Interurban Transit Partnership, which brands itself as "The Rapid."  Transportation is also provided by the DASH buses: the "Downtown Area Shuttle." These provide transportation to and from the parking lots in the city of Grand Rapids to various designated loading and unloading spots around the city.

Railroad
Amtrak provides direct train service to Chicago from the passenger station via the Pere Marquette line.  Freight service is provided by CN, CSX Transportation, and by a local short-line railroad, the Grand Rapids Eastern Railroad.

Highways

 (concurrent with US 131)

County-designated highways

Economy
These corporations are headquartered in Kent County, in the following communities:
Amway, Ada
American Seating, Grand Rapids
Bissell Homecare, Walker
Gordon Food Service, Wyoming
Meijer, Walker
Old Orchard, Sparta
Spartan Stores, Byron Township
Steelcase, Grand Rapids
Universal Forest Products, Grand Rapids Township
Wolverine Worldwide, Rockford
X-Rite, Kentwood
Zondervan, Cascade Township

Government
The county government operates the jail, maintains rural roads, operates the major local courts, keeps files of deeds and mortgages, maintains vital records, administers public health regulations, and participates with the state in the provision of welfare and other social services. The county board of commissioners controls the budget but has only limited authority to make laws or ordinances.  In Michigan, most local government functions—police and fire, building and zoning, tax assessment, street maintenance, etc.—are the responsibility of individual cities and townships.

Elected officials
 Prosecuting Attorney: Chris Becker (Republican)
 Sheriff: Michelle LaJoye-Young (Republican)
 County Clerk/Register of Deeds: Lisa Posthumus Lyons (Republican)
 County Treasurer: Peter MacGregor (Republican)
 Drain Commissioner: Ken Yonker (Republican)
 County Commission or Board of Commissioners: 19 members, elected from districts (11 Republicans, 8 Democrats), Mandy Bolter (Republican) serves as board chair.
 Circuit Court: 10 judges (non-partisan)
 Probate Court: 3 judges (non-partisan)

(information as of post-2018 election)

Politics

Historically, Kent County, like West Michigan as a whole, was a stronghold for the Republican Party. However, the Democratic Party has received increased support since the 2000s, with Grand Rapids and nearby suburbs supporting the Democratic Party while more rural areas support the Republican Party.  Grand Rapids also normally sends Democrats to the state legislature.

In 2008, Democratic presidential candidate Barack Obama narrowly carried the county, receiving 49.34% of its votes to Republican John McCain's 48.83%. It was the first time the county had supported a Democrat for president since 1964, and only the fourth time since 1884. By comparison, George W. Bush had taken almost 59 percent of the county's vote in 2004.

In 2012, the county returned to the Republican camp as Mitt Romney won 53.0% of the vote to Obama's 45.35%.  Four years later, Republican Donald Trump won the county  with 47.66% of the vote, to 44.61% for his Democratic rival, Hillary Clinton, while Gary Johnson of the Libertarian Party received 4.58%.

In 2020, Joe Biden received nearly 52% of the votes in the county, the largest vote share for a Democratic candidate since Lyndon Johnson in 1964. In comparison, Barack Obama narrowly carried the county by 1,573 votes in 2008.

Kent County is one of only thirteen counties in the United States to have voted for Obama in 2008, Romney in 2012, Trump in 2016, and Biden in 2020.

Today, the county is considered a bellwether politically.  In 2018, Gretchen Whitmer became the first Democratic governor to win the county after James Blanchard's 1986 landslide re-election. Also during the same cycle, incumbent Democratic Senator Debbie Stabenow narrowly carried the county by 0.3 points, only the second time (following Carl Levin in 2008) since Donald Riegle in 1982 the county supported a Democrat for Senate.

Despite the county's bellwether status at the federal and state level, it remains very Republican downballot. The GOP still holds most county-level offices, as well as a majority on the county commission. The Democrats representing Grand Rapids-based districts in the state legislature are typically the only elected Democrats above the county level.

In the House of Representatives, the bulk of the county has been located in the Michigan's 3rd congressional district since the 1993 redistricting cycle. That district had previously been the 5th congressional district from 1873 to 1993. The current Representative for the district is Democrat Hillary Scholten. In the House, Grand Rapids had been represented by a Republican since 1977, after Richard Vander Veen, first elected in a 1974 special election following the district's long-time Representative Gerald Ford's ascension to Vice President, was ousted by Harold S. Sawyer. Until 2023, the city had been represented by a Republican for all but 35 months since 1913.

A sliver of northern and eastern Kent County, including Cedar Springs and Lowell, is in the 2nd congressional district, represented by Republican John Moolenaar.

Communities

Cities

 Cedar Springs
 East Grand Rapids
 Grand Rapids (county seat)
 Grandville
 Kentwood
 Lowell
 Rockford
 Walker
 Wyoming

Villages
 Caledonia
 Casnovia (partial)
 Kent City
 Sand Lake
 Sparta

Charter townships

Caledonia Charter Township
Cascade Charter Township
Gaines Charter Township
Grand Rapids Charter Township
Lowell Charter Township
Plainfield Charter Township

Civil townships

Ada Township
Algoma Township
Alpine Township
Bowne Township
Byron Township
Cannon Township
Courtland Township
Grattan Township
Nelson Township
Oakfield Township
Solon Township
Sparta Township
Spencer Township
Tyrone Township
Vergennes Township

Census-designated places
 Byron Center
 Cannonsburg
 Comstock Park
 Cutlerville
 Forest Hills
 Northview

Other unincorporated communities

 Ada
 Alaska
 Alto
 Belmont
 Cascade
 Chauncey
 Dutton
 Englishville
 Parnell

See also

 Kent District Library
 List of Michigan State Historic Sites in Kent County, Michigan
 National Register of Historic Places listings in Kent County, Michigan

Notes

References

Further reading

External links

Official Website of Kent County, Michigan
Official GIS Map of Kent County, Michigan
History and Genealogy of Kent County, Michigan
Kent County Open Government Project - A non-partisan resource for comparing tax rates, school districts, and local government transparency across Kent County

 
Michigan counties
1836 establishments in Michigan Territory
Populated places established in 1836
Grand Rapids metropolitan area